Siah Cham (maybe Romanized as Sīāh Cham) is village on Kashkan Rural District, Shahivand District, Dowreh County, Lorestan Province, Iran, in census of 2006, population was 119, in 22 families.

References

Towns and villages in Dowreh County